Sonia Mkoloma (born 17 January 1979) is a former English international netball player. Mkoloma made her international debut for the English national team in 1999, and during her career has competed at three Netball World Championships, three Commonwealth Games and two World Netball Series. In 2009, Mkoloma was part of the World 7 team, consisting of international players from England, Jamaica, Samoa as well as former Australian and New Zealand international players. In the domestic Netball Superleague she played with the Surrey Storm (formerly Brunel Hurricanes) with best friend and fellow England defender Geva Mentor.

Mkoloma also played in the Australasian ANZ Championship: she played for the Wellington-based Central Pulse in the 2008 season, and for the Christchurch-based Canterbury Tactix in 2009. In 2010, she transferred to the New South Wales Swifts in Australia. Mkoloma continued with the Swifts in 2011, and was part of the England national team for the 2011 World Championships and 2015 World Cup.

On 11 April 2011, Mkoloma played her 50th ANZ Championship match between the Swifts and the Magic. By the end of the 2014 ANZ season, Sonia left the Swifts after 69 appearances and five seasons at the club. She has 95 ANZ caps.

ANZ Championship accolades
 2013 NSW Swifts Players' Player Award
 2008 joint-ANZ Championship Most Valuable Player

National representation
 1999–2011; 2015 (England)
 Test Caps: 129

Netball career facts
 2013 England Netball Hall of Fame Inductee
 Bronze medal at 2007, 2011 and 2015 World Netball Championships 
 Bronze medal at the Commonwealth Games (2006 & 2010)

References

External links

 2010 ANZ Championship profile

1979 births
English netball players
Commonwealth Games bronze medallists for England
Netball players at the 2002 Commonwealth Games
Netball players at the 2006 Commonwealth Games
Netball players at the 2010 Commonwealth Games
New South Wales Swifts players
Mainland Tactix players
Central Pulse players
Sportspeople from London
Black British sportswomen
Living people
Commonwealth Games medallists in netball
Netball Superleague players
Surrey Storm players
AENA Super Cup players
English expatriate netball people in New Zealand
English expatriate netball people in Australia
1999 World Netball Championships players
2011 World Netball Championships players
2015 Netball World Cup players
English people of Malawian descent
English sportspeople of African descent
English sportspeople of Barbadian descent
Medallists at the 2006 Commonwealth Games
Medallists at the 2010 Commonwealth Games